This is a list of the Top 20 singles in 2006 in New Zealand, as listed by the Recording Industry Association of New Zealand (RIANZ).

Chart
Songs in grey shading indicates a song of New Zealand origin.

Key
 – Song of New Zealand origin

Notes

References

External links
 The Official NZ Music Chart, RIANZ website

2006 in New Zealand music
2006 record charts
Singles 2006